Titia Brongersma (Dokkum, Friesland, 1650 – Groningen, 1700) was a Frisian poet of the late 17th century. Her book, De bron-swaan, was published in 1686 and is virtually the only trace of her literary activity. She also gained prominence for excavating a dolmen at Borger, Netherlands in 1685.

Brongersma became widely known for her excavation of the dolmen in Borger in Drenthe. She heard about the dolmen (these are called hunebed in Dutch, plural hunebedden) when she visited Jan Laurens Lenting(h), the schout of Borger, around Pentecost 1685. In July she had one of the hunebedden excavated; to everyone's surprise the dolmen was a grave site, rather than just a heap of rocks created by giants. She wrote a poem on the topic, "Ode on the hunebed".

Selected works

 De bron-swaan of mengeldigten van Titia Brongersma, 1686
 Eric Miller, The Swan of the Well by Titia Brongersma. 2020, McGill-Queen’s University Press, Montreal & Kingston, London, Chicago. 538 pp. [bilingual en nl]
 Hemelsche orgeltoonen, ?

See also
1680s in archaeology
Timeline of women in science

References

Bibliography
 Aa (van der), Abraham Jacob. Nieuw biographisch, anthologisch en critisch woordenboek van Nederlandsche dichters. partie I, A-B. W. Amsterdam, De Grebber, 1844, p. 479. (Dutch language)
 Aa (van der), Abraham Jacob. Biographisch woordenboek der Nederlanden: deel 2, derde en vierde stuk, Haarlem, Van Brederode, 1855, p. 1392–1393. (Dutch language)
 Dykstra, Klaes, et Bouke Oldenhof. Lyts hânboek fan de Fryske literatuer, 2e éd., améliorée et élargie, Leeuwarden, Afûk, 1997, p. 27. (West Frisian language)
 Frederiks, Johannes Godefridus, et Frans Jos. van den Branden. Biographisch woordenboek der Noord- en Zuidnederlandsche letterkunde, Amsterdam, Veen, 1888–1891, p. 120–121. (Dutch language)
 Gemert (van), Lia. « Hiding Behind Words? Lesbianism in 17th-Century Dutch Poetry », Thamyris. Mythmaking from past to present 2, 1995, p. 11–44.
 Jensen, Lotte. « Brongersma, Titia », Digitaal Vrouwenlexicon van Nederland, [En ligne], 6 octobre 2009, réf. du 8 août 2014. resources.huygens.knaw.nl (Huygens Instituut voor Nederlandse Geschiedenis). (Dutch language)
 Jeu (de), Annelies. ’t Spoor der dichteressen: netwerken en publicatiemogelijkheden van schrijvende vrouwen in de Republiek (1600-1750), Hilversum, Verloren, 2000, p. 115–131. (Dutch language)
 Klapwijk, Cees (réd.). Titia Brongersma - een noordelijke ster; Dokkum ca. 1650 - ? na 1687, [En ligne], [s. d.], réf. du 8 août 2014. [literatuurgeschiedenis.nl]. (Dutch language)
 Meijer Drees, Marijke, « Het roemrugt'bre jufferdom van Groningen. Over De bron-swaan, of mengeldichten van Titia Brongersma », Klinkend boeket: studies over renaissancesonnetten voor Marijke Spies (différents auteurs), Hilversum, Verloren, 1994, p. 151. (Dutch language)

 

1650 births
1700 deaths
17th-century Dutch poets
17th-century Dutch women writers
17th-century Dutch writers
People from Dokkum
West Frisian-language writers
Dutch women archaeologists
Dutch women poets